Mill Creek, Nova Scotia could be the following places in Nova Scotia:

Mill Creek, Cumberland County in Cumberland County
Mill Creek, Cape Breton in the Cape Breton Regional Municipality